The Chan's Colour-Illustrated Stamp Catalogue of China (1878-1949) is published in softcover and hardcover editions. Text is in both English and Chinese. As of 2011 the latest edition is the 2-volume, 898 page, 2010 edition.

To correlate catalog numbers between the Chan, Ma, and Scott catalogs China 1878-1949 Scott/Ma/Chan Catalog Correlation Including Japanese Occupation of China, Shanghai-Treaty Ports, and Manchukuo by Ralph Weil with Michael Rogers. 2006, second edition may be useful.

References
China and Asia Literature Michael Rogers Inc

External links and further reading
"New edition of Chan catalog is indispensable for collectors" article by Michael Rogers published in Linn's November 1, 2010

Philately of China
Stamp catalogs